DNA replication licensing factor MCM8 is a protein that in humans is encoded by the MCM8 gene.

The protein encoded by this gene is one of the highly conserved mini-chromosome maintenance proteins (MCM) that are essential for the initiation of eukaryotic genome replication. The hexameric protein complex formed by the MCM proteins is a key component of the pre-replication complex (pre_RC) and may be involved in the formation of replication forks and in the recruitment of other DNA replication related proteins. This protein contains the central domain that is conserved among the MCM proteins. This protein has been shown to co-immunoprecipitate with MCM4, 6 and 7, which suggests that it may interact with other MCM proteins and play a role in DNA replication. Alternatively spliced transcript variants encoding distinct isoforms have been described.

DNA repair

MCM8-deficient mice are defective in gametogenesis and display genome instability due to impaired homologous recombination.  Male MCM8 (-/-) mice are sterile because spermatocytes are blocked in meiotic prophase I.  Female MCM8(-/-) mice have arrested primary follicles and frequently develop ovarian tumors.  MCM8 protein forms a complex with MCM9.

In the plant Arabidopsis thaliana, MCM8 is required for a pathway of meiotic DNA double-strand break repair.  It was proposed that MCM8 is involved with RAD51 in a backup pathway that repairs meiotic double-strand breaks without yielding crossovers when the major recombination pathway, which relies on DMC1, fails.

MCM8 forms a complex with MCM9 that is required for DNA resection by the MRN complex (MRE11-RAD50-NBS1) at double strand breaks to generate single-stranded DNA ends.  The formation of single-strand ends is an early step in homologous recombination (see Figure).   MCM8/MCM9 interacts with MRN and is required for the nuclease action and stable association of MRN with double-strand breaks.  

In humans, an MCM8 mutation can give rise to premature ovarian failure, as well as chromosomal instability.

See also
Mini Chromosome Maintenance

References

Further reading